The 2004 United States presidential election in Florida took place on November 2, 2004, as part of the 2004 United States presidential election. Voters chose 27 representatives, or electors to the Electoral College, who voted for president and vice president.

Florida was won by incumbent President George W. Bush by a 5.01% margin of victory. Prior to the election, most news organizations considered this a swing state that was leaning towards Bush. Once again, Florida was under the national spotlight due to its high number of electoral votes and the fresh memory of the controversy surrounding the 2000 Florida vote. Turnout was much higher, going from an estimated 6 million voters in 2000 to over 7.5 million voters showing up to vote in 2004. This remains the last time that any candidate won Florida by a greater than 5% margin and the last time a Republican won a majority of the state's popular vote until 2020.

As of 2022, this is the most recent time that Florida voted to the left of Virginia in a presidential election.

Campaign

Predictions
There were 12 news organizations who made state-by-state predictions of the election. Here are their last predictions before election day.

Polling

Throughout the general election, candidates exchanged narrow leads in the state. The final 3 poll averaged showed Bush leading with 49% to Kerry's 47%.

Fundraising
Bush raised $16,956,510. Kerry raised $7,285,151.

Advertising and visits
This state was heavily targeted as a swing state. Over the course of the election, Bush visited the state 15 times to Kerry's 18 times. Also, both candidates spent heavily on television advertisements, spending an estimated $3 million each week.

Analysis 

During the 2004 U.S. presidential election, numerous allegations of irregularities were made concerning the voting process in Florida. These allegations included missing and uncounted votes, machine malfunction, and a lack of correlation between the vote count and exit polling.

In the prior election, Ralph Nader obtained over 2% of the vote, thus Bush won with less than 50% of the vote, making his approval rating and his brother's approval ratings the deciding factor of the state. Polls throughout the campaign indicated that Florida was too close to call, prompting concerns about a repeat of the 2000 fiasco. However, the high popularity of George W. Bush's brother, Republican Governor Jeb Bush, contributed to a relatively comfortable victory for Bush, by a margin of 5% over his Democratic rival, John Kerry.

While the South Florida metropolitan area mostly voted for Kerry, the other parts of the state mainly supported Bush, being culturally closer to the rest of the southern United States than to Miami, home to large Hispanic and Jewish populations, as well as retirees and transplants from the largely liberal Northeastern United States.

Key to Bush's victory was increased turnout in Republican areas. Bush's margin of victory in several counties topped 70%, particularly in the Florida Panhandle.  Bush also won a significant number of heavily populated and fast-growing areas including Jacksonville, the entire Tampa Bay area, Southwest Florida, Orlando, the Space Coast, and Ocala.

, this is the last election in which Hillsborough County and Osceola County voted for the Republican candidate. This is also the last time that the cities of Orlando, Tampa, and Kissimmee have voted Republican in a presidential election.

Results

By county

Counties that flipped from Democratic to Republican 
 Flagler (largest municipality: Palm Coast)
 Hernando (largest municipality: Spring Hill)
 Osceola (largest municipality: Kissimmee)
 Pasco (largest municipality: Wesley Chapel)
 Pinellas (largest municipality: St. Petersburg)

By congressional district
Bush won 18 of 25 congressional districts. Kerry won 7 districts, including one held by a Republican.

Electors 

Technically the voters of Florida cast their ballots for electors: representatives to the Electoral College. Florida is allocated 27 electors because it has 25 congressional districts and 2 senators. All candidates who appear on the ballot or qualify to receive write-in votes must submit a list of 27 electors, who pledge to vote for their candidate and his or her running mate. Whoever wins the majority of votes in the state is awarded all 27 electoral votes. Their chosen electors then vote for president and vice president. Although electors are pledged to their candidate and running mate, they are not obligated to vote for them. An elector who votes for someone other than his or her candidate is known as a faithless elector.

The electors of each state and the District of Columbia met on December 13, 2004, to cast their votes for president and vice president. The Electoral College itself never meets as one body. Instead the electors from each state and the District of Columbia met in their respective capitols.

The following were the members of the Electoral College from Florida. All were pledged to and voted for George W. Bush and Dick Cheney.

 Al Austin
 Allan Bense
 Sally Bradshaw
Al Cardenas
 Jennifer Carroll
 Armando Codina
 Sharon Day
 Maria de la Milera
 Jim Dozier
 David Griffin
 Fran Hancock
 Cynthia Handley
 William Harrison
 Al Hoffman
 Bill Jordan
 Tom Lee
 Randall McElheney
 Jeanne McIntosh
 Nancy Mihm
 Gary Morse
 Marilyn Paul
 Tom Petway
 Sergio Pino
 John Thrasher
 Janet Westling
 Robert Woody
 Zach Zachariah

References

External links
Official election results

Florida
2004
2004 Florida elections